Big Dick Point is a summit in Shoshone County, Idaho, in the United States.

References

Mountains of Shoshone County, Idaho
Mountains of Idaho